Salvail is a French surname.

Notable people with this surname include:

 Éric Salvail (born 1969), Canadian radio and television personality
 Ève Salvail (born 1973), Canadian model

See also
 Salvail River, Quebec, Canada

References